Steel and Industrial Forgings Ltd (SIFL) is a public sector undertaking (PSU) fully owned by Government of Kerala situated in Athani in Thrissur, Kerala state of India.  The company was incorporated in 1983 and started commercial production in 1986. It is an AS 9100 C and ISO 9001:2008 certified company.

References

State agencies of Kerala
Companies based in Thrissur
Engineering companies of India
1983 establishments in Kerala
Indian companies established in 1983
Manufacturing companies established in 1983